Siren Rock is a fairly isolated rock lying 12 nautical miles (22 km) east of Mount Moses, in the east part of the Hudson Mountains. Mapped by United States Geological Survey (USGS) from surveys and U.S. Navy air photos, 1960–66. Named by Advisory Committee on Antarctic Names (US-ACAN) for Jan C. Siren, radio scientist at Byrd Station, 1967.

Hudson Mountains
Rock formations of Ellsworth Land
Volcanoes of Ellsworth Land